Odostomia vicola is a species of sea snail, a marine gastropod mollusk in the family Pyramidellidae, the pyrams and their allies.

Description
The white shell has an elongate-ovate shape. Its length measures 2.7 mm. The whorls of the protoconch are deeply obliquely
immersed in the first of the succeeding turns. The six whorls of the teleoconch are flattened, strongly contracted at the periphery, and well shouldered at the summit. They are marked by strong, somewhat retractive axial ribs, which terminate at the posterior edge of the first supraperipheral keel, which is smooth. Of these ribs, 18 occur upon the second, 20 upon the third, 22 upon the fourth, and 27 upon the penultimate turn. In addition to the axial ribs the whorls are marked by four spiral keels, which equal the ribs in strength and render their junction nodulous. The spaces enclosed by the axial ribs and spiral cords are well impressed round pits.

The sutures are strongly channeled. The periphery of the body whorl is marked by a strong groove. The base of the body whorl is well rounded. It is marked by five spiral cords, which grow successively a little weaker from the periphery to the umbilical area. The spaces between these cords are marked by slender spiral threads, which correspond to the ribs on the spire. The aperture is oval. The posterior angle is obtuse. The outer lip is thin, rendered wavy by the spiral cords. The 
columella is moderately strong, decidedly curved, reflected, and reinforced by the base. It is provided with a slender fold at its insertion.

Distribution
The type species was found in the Pacific Ocean off San Pedro Bay, California.

References

External links
 ITIS

vincta
Gastropods described in 1909